The Global Initiative to Combat Nuclear Terrorism (GICNT) is an international organization consisting of 89 countries that have endorsed a set of nuclear security principles for nuclear terrorism deterrence, prevention, detection, and response. It is co-chaired by the United States and Russia. The organization aims to develop partnership capacity to combat nuclear terrorism, consistent with national legal authorities and obligations as well as relevant international legal frameworks such as the Convention for the Suppression of Acts of Nuclear Terrorism, the Convention on the Physical Protection of Nuclear Material, and United Nations Security Council Resolutions 1373 and 1540.

Overview
On July 16, 2006, Presidents George W. Bush and Vladimir Putin jointly announced the organization of the Global Initiative to Combat Nuclear Terrorism (GICNT). The GICNT is a voluntary initiative aimed at fostering international cooperation in order to prevent terrorists from acquiring, transporting, or using nuclear materials or radioactive substances, deter hostile actions against nuclear facilities, and respond to incidents involving the use of radiological or nuclear materials.  GICNT participants work to unite experience and expertise from the nonproliferation, counter-proliferation, and counter-terrorism fields; strengthen global activities and institutions through the integration of collective capabilities and resources; and maintain a network for partners to share information and expertise in a legally non-binding capacity.

The founding 13 nations gathered in Rabat, Morocco, on October 30–31, 2006, for the first Plenary Meeting and agreed to a framework for the partnership, and a system for organizing events and charting nation progress.  The Statement of Principles was the final product that guides GICNT efforts.  Any country may choose to officially endorse in order to become a partner of the GICNT.

On April 5, 2009, President Barack Obama in his Prague Speech called for making the GICNT a "durable international institution." The historic 2010 Nuclear Security Summit, which President Obama initiated and hosted, highlighted the contributions of the GICNT to international efforts to combat nuclear terrorism.

The June 29, 2010, Plenary Meeting in Abu Dhabi, United Arab Emirates, resulted in several changes to the GICNT. The partnership adopted a revised Terms of Reference, activated an Implementation and Assessment Group (IAG), selected Spain as the Coordinator for the IAG, and selected the U.S. and Russia to continue serving as the Co-Chairs.

During the May 24, 2013, Plenary Meeting in Mexico City, Mexico, the partnership endorsed the Republic of Korea as the IAG Coordinator for a two-year term.  During the June 17, 2015, Plenary Meeting in Helsinki, Finland, the partnership endorsed the Netherlands as the IAG Coordinator for a two-year term.

During the June 5, 2019, Plenary Meeting in Buenos Aires, Argentina the GICNT welcomed the United Nations Office of Counter-Terrorism (UNOCT) as an Official Observer organization. The partnership also endorsed the Kingdom of Morocco as the IAG Coordinator for the term 2019-2021.

Statement of Principles
 Develop, if necessary, and improve accounting, control, and physical protection systems for nuclear and other radioactive materials and substances.
 Enhance security of civilian nuclear facilities.
 Improve the ability to detect nuclear and other radioactive materials and substances in order to prevent illicit trafficking in such materials and substances, to include cooperation in the research and development of national detection capabilities that would be interoperable.
 Improve capabilities of participants to search for, confiscate, and establish safe control over unlawfully held nuclear or other radioactive materials and substances or devices using them.
 Prevent the provision of safe haven to terrorists and financial or economic resources to terrorists seeking to acquire or use nuclear and other radioactive materials and substances.
 Ensure adequate respective national legal and regulatory frameworks sufficient to provide for the implementation of appropriate criminal and, if applicable, civil liability for terrorists and those who facilitate acts of nuclear terrorism.
 Improve capabilities of participants for response, mitigation, and investigation, in cases of terrorist attacks involving the use of nuclear and other radioactive materials and substances, including the development of technical means to identify nuclear and other radioactive materials and substances that are, or maybe, involved in the incident.
 Promote information sharing pertaining to the suppression of acts of nuclear terrorism and their facilitation, taking appropriate measures consistent with their national law and international obligations to protect the confidentiality of any information which they exchange in confidence.

Partner nations

1. 
2. 
3. 
4. 
5. 
6. 
7. 
8. 
9. 
10. 
11. 
12. 
13. 
14. 
15. 
16. 
17. 
18. 
19. 
20. 
21. 
22. 
23. 
24. 
25. 
26. 
27.  Georgia
28. 
29. 

30. 
31. 
32. 
33. 
34. 
35. 
36. 
37. 
38. 
39. 
40. 
41. 
42. 
43. 
44. 
45. 
46. 
47. 
48. 
49. 
50. 
51. 
52. 
53. 
54. 
55. 
56. 
57. 
58. 
59. 

60. 
61. 
62. 
63. 
64. 
65. 
66. 
67. 
68. 
69. 
70. 
71. 
72. 
73. 
74. 
75. 
76. 
77. 
78. 
79. 
80. 
81. 
82. 
83. 
84. 
85. 
86. 
87. 
88. 
89. 

 IAEA (observer)
 UNODC (observer)
 (observer)
INTERPOL (observer)
 UNICRI (observer)
 UNOCT (observer)

Criticisms
While the GICNT has garnered many members and held many events, there are some in the academic community who believe there is room for expansion and improvement.  In a piece evaluating the GICNT, the Stimson Center notes that the GICNT will be useful for countries to fulfill their UNSCR 1540 commitments.  However it points out that many countries that fissile material cannot afford the funds and manpower needed to implement necessary safeguards, and the GICNT does not provide a mechanism to address this shortcoming.  WMD Insights published a similar piece that applauded the expansive growth of the GICNT.  At the same time, it recognized that this large partnership could impede nations' ability to "harmonize their long-term research and development programs" as well as construct detailed plans for dealing with the "sources, magnitude, and appropriate responses to nuclear terrorist threats."  Finally, George Bunn writes that the GICNT is an important first step but has failed to rapidly upgrade security for nuclear stockpiles and places few demands on a country for membership.

See also
 Counter-terrorism
 List of designated terrorist organizations
 List of terrorist incidents
 Lists of nuclear disasters and radioactive incidents
 Nuclear Non-Proliferation Treaty
 Nuclear technology
 Nuclear weapon
 Proliferation Security Initiative
 Terrorism

References

External links
 GICNT Public Homepage

Nuclear terrorism
Intergovernmental organizations
Organizations established in 2006
Russia–United States relations
Presidency of George W. Bush
Vladimir Putin